The politics of Aquitaine, France takes place in a framework of a presidential representative democracy, whereby the President of Regional Council is the head of government, and of a pluriform multi-party system. Legislative power is vested in the regional council.

Executive

The executive of the region is led by the President of the regional council.

Current composition

 Alain Rousset (PS): President
 Jean-Louis Carrère (PS): 1st Vice President 
 Françoise Cartron (PS): 2nd Vice President 
 Georges Labazée (PS): 3rd Vice President
 Jean-Pierre Dufour (Green): 4th Vice President
 Michel Moyrand (PS): 5th Vice President
 Jean Guérard (PS): 6th Vice President
 Alain Anziani (PS): 7th Vice President
 François Deluga (PS): 8th Vice President
 Anne-Marie Cocula (DVG): 9th Vice President
 Rose-Marie Schmitt (Green): 10th Vice President
 Henri Houdebert (PS): 11th Vice President
 François Maïtia (PS): 12th Vice President
 Béatrice Gendreau (PS): 13th Vice President
 Jean Lissar (Green): 14th Vice President
 Stéphane Delpeyrat (PS): 15th Vice President

List of presidents

Legislative branch

The Regional Council of Aquitaine (Conseil régional d'Aquitaine) is composed of 85 councillors, elected by proportional representation in a two-round system. The winning list in the second round is automatically entitled to a quarter of the seats. The remainder of the seats are allocated through proportional representation with a 5% threshold.

The council is elected for a six-year term.

Current composition

Elections

Other elections

In the 2007 legislative election, the PS won 16 seats, the UMP won 7, and the MoDem won two. In addition, the New Centre won one seat, as did the Greens.

References

External links
Aquitaine Region